Provincial Road 409 (PR 409) is a provincial road in the Canadian province of Manitoba.  The single lane paved road runs from the Perimeter Highway (where it connects with Pipeline Road south), turn east north of Burns Road (as Grassmere Road) to PR 220 (Blackdale Road) in West St. Paul. 

It is not a major route, primarily serving agricultural areas and suburban homes north of Winnipeg.

External links 
Official Highway Map of Manitoba - Winnipeg

409